The city of Chicago, Illinois, is home to many notable works of public art on permanent display in an outdoor public space.

References

External links
 

Art, Public
Chicago

Art, Public